Razeh or Razzeh or Rezeh may refer to:
 Razeh, Gilan
 Razeh, South Khorasan